Martha Clare Morris (1955 – February 15, 2020) was an American nutritional epidemiologist who studied the link between diet and Alzheimer's disease. She led a team of researchers at the Rush University Medical Center to develop the MIND diet.

Early life and education 
Martha Clare Chinn grew up in Flossmoor, Illinois. She graduated from Homewood Flossmoor High School. She completed an undergraduate degree at the University of Iowa, followed by a master of sociology at the same university. She undertook her doctoral studies at the Harvard T.H. Chan School of Public Health, graduating with an ScD.

Career 
Morris worked with Denis Evans while completing her ScD and, in 1992, moved to Rush University Medical Center in Chicago with him. On Evans' retirement some years later, Morris became director of the Institute for Healthy Aging at Rush.

Her researched focused on diet, rather than just genetics, being a significant contributor to dementia, in particular Alzheimer's disease. Leading a team of researchers at Rush, she developed the Mediterranean-DASH Intervention for Neurodegenerative Delay diet, commonly known as the MIND diet.

Morris died of cancer at her Oak Park home on February 15, 2020.

Works

Book 
 Diet for the MIND: The Latest Science on What to Eat to Prevent Alzheimer's and Cognitive Decline, 2017

Selected journal articles

References 

1955 births
2020 deaths
American epidemiologists
American nutritionists
American women scientists
University of Iowa alumni
Rush University faculty
People from Flossmoor, Illinois
Harvard School of Public Health alumni